Igor Mihailovich Shalimov (born 2 February 1969) is a Russian football manager and former player. During his playing career, he played as a midfielder, primarily in the wide position.

Playing career
Shalimov started his playing career in Spartak Moscow. After a few seasons with Spartak Moscow he transferred to Foggia in Italy. He then transferred to Inter Milan. He has also played in the Italian Serie A for Bologna, Udinese and Napoli, as well as MSV Duisburg in Germany and FC Lugano in Switzerland.

He was a member of the USSR national team which participated in the 1990 FIFA World Cup. After the dissolution of the Soviet Union, he represented the unified CIS team at the European Championship held in Sweden. He was one of a number of players who refused to play for then-coach Pavel Sadyrin at the 1994 FIFA World Cup. Two years later, in 1996, he was a member of the Russia national team for the European Championship held in England.

Shalimov ended his playing career in Napoli after being banned for two years for testing positive for nandrolone, a banned anabolic steroid substance. He has claimed that an anabolic containing nandrolone was given to him while he was hospitalized in Moscow, to stop an internal bleeding.

Managerial career
Shalimov was appointed manager of Russia women's national team in 2008, before being promoted to deputy sporting director for national teams and selection at the Russian Football Union in 2011.

He was dismissed as the manager of FC Krasnodar on 2 April 2018.

On 5 June 2018, he signed a two-year contract with FC Khimki. He left Khimki on 2 April 2019, with the team in 14th place and three points above the relegation zone.

On 30 September 2019, he was hired by Russian Premier League club Akhmat Grozny. He left Akhmat on 26 July 2020 as his contract expired.

On 10 August 2021, he was hired by Russian Premier League club Ural Yekaterinburg. Shalimov was dismissed by Ural on 8 August 2022 after losing the first 4 games in the 2022–23 Russian Premier League season.

Career statistics

Club

International
Scores and results list Soviet Union's and Russia's goal tally first, score column indicates score after each Shalimov goal.

Honours

Player
Spartak Moscow
Soviet Top League: 1989

Inter Milan
UEFA Cup: 1993–94

USSR U21
UEFA European Under-21 Championship: 1990

References

Living people
1969 births
Footballers from Moscow
Association football midfielders
Soviet footballers
Soviet Union international footballers
Russian footballers
Soviet Union under-21 international footballers
Russia international footballers
Dual internationalists (football)
Russian football managers
FC Spartak Moscow players
Calcio Foggia 1920 players
Inter Milan players
UEFA Cup winning players
Udinese Calcio players
Bologna F.C. 1909 players
S.S.C. Napoli players
Soviet Top League players
Serie A players
Serie B players
MSV Duisburg players
Bundesliga players
FC Lugano players
Swiss Super League players
1990 FIFA World Cup players
UEFA Euro 1992 players
UEFA Euro 1996 players
Russian expatriate footballers
Russian expatriate sportspeople in Germany
Russian expatriate sportspeople in Italy
Russian expatriate sportspeople in Switzerland
Expatriate footballers in Italy
Expatriate footballers in Switzerland
Expatriate footballers in Germany
FC Elista managers
Russian Premier League managers
Russia women's national football team managers
FC Krasnodar managers
FC Khimki managers
FC Akhmat Grozny managers
FC Ural Yekaterinburg managers
Soviet sportspeople in doping cases
Russian sportspeople in doping cases